The Saint Pamphile Border Crossing, connecting Saint-Pamphile, Quebec to the US state of Maine across the Canada–United States border, is primarily used by Canadian logging trucks to access the privately owned North Maine Woods in Maine. Near the US port of entry is a company check station that issues permits to enter the woods. Logging operations have been conducted in this part of Maine for decades, and the processing plant in Canada is adjacent to the international boundary. The roads in the US are generally not passable into eastern Maine and in some cases are gated.

See also
 List of Canada–United States border crossings

References

Canada–United States border crossings
1949 establishments in Maine
1949 establishments in Quebec